The Ghost Baron (Swedish: Spökbaronen) is a 1927 Swedish drama film directed by Gustaf Edgren and starring Fridolf Rhudin, Karin Swanström and Enrique Rivero. It was shot at the Råsunda Studios in Stockholm. The film's sets were designed by the art director Vilhelm Bryde. It was released in Britain under the alternative title 	A Sailor's Farewell.

Cast
 Fridolf Rhudin as 	Baron Conrad Wirvelpihl
 Karin Swanström as 	Countess Stjärnstråle
 Laure Savidge as 	Katy Holst
 Enrique Rivero as Lt. Gösta Bramberg
 Weyler Hildebrand as 	Göran Göransson
 Anita Brodin as 	Gurli Stjärnstråle
 Oscar Byström as 	Waldman
 John Melin as 	Cook
 Thor Modéen as 	Hair Dresser

References

Bibliography
 Gustafsson, Tommy. Masculinity in the Golden Age of Swedish Cinema: A Cultural Analysis of 1920s Films. McFarland, 2014.

External links

1927 films
1927 drama films
Swedish drama films
Swedish silent feature films
Swedish black-and-white films
Films directed by Gustaf Edgren
1920s Swedish-language films
Silent drama films
1920s Swedish films